Numerous vessels have borne the name Scotia or Scotian, named after Scotia, an ancient name for Scotland, including:

, a passenger steamer built for service between Glasgow and Dublin, and later the first steam vessel owned in Malta
, a passenger steamer operating between Glasgow and Stranraer until 1863, then an American Civil War blockade runner
, a passenger steamer in service between England and Ireland from 1847 to 1861, then an American Civil War blockade runner
 (1861), a British passenger paddle steamship operated by the Cunard Line on the North Atlantic
Scotia (1876), a barque-rigged research vessel used by the Scottish National Antarctic Expedition of 1902-1905
, a British Columbia paddle steamer in use on the River Yukon until 1917, destroyed by fire in 1967
 (1898), passenger liner with Allan Line and Canadian Pacific from 1911, built as Statendam
, in service with the London and North Western Railway until 1920
, in service with the London and North Western Railway and the London, Midland and Scottish Railway until sunk in 1940

Citations

Ship names